El derecho de nacer ("The right to be born") may refer to:

, a radionovela (radioplay) by Félix B. Caignet
El derecho de nacer (film), a 1952 film
 El derecho de nacer (1959 telenovela), made in Puerto Rico, starring Helena Montalban and Braulio Castillo
El derecho de nacer, made in Perú, starring Sylvia Vegas and Miguel Arnaiz 
, a 1965 telenovela with Conchita Obach by RCTV
El derecho de nacer (1966 TV series), a Mexican telenovela
El derecho de nacer (1981 TV series), a telenovela with Verónica Castro
El derecho de nacer (2001 TV series), a telenovela with Kate del Castillo

See also
 :es:El derecho de nacer, a more extensive list in Spanish Wikipedia